Richard Sherman may refer to:
Richard M. Sherman (born 1928), American songwriter
Richard Sherman (American football) (born 1988), American football player
Richard U. Sherman (1819–1895), New York State politician and newspaper publisher/editor
Richard Sherman (MP) for Derby
Richard Sherman, a character from the play The Seven Year Itch

See also
Richard Herman (disambiguation)